Chris Rea is the fourth studio album by British singer-songwriter Chris Rea, released in 1981. It charted on the UK album charts, peaking at number fifty-two. The single "Loving You" peaked at number sixty-five on the UK singles chart, and charted on the U.S. Billboard Hot 100 at eighty-eight and charted for 3 weeks.

Rea would later re-use a verse from "When You Know Your Love Has Died" for his single "Que Sera" taken from his 1987 album Dancing with Strangers

Track listing
All songs written by Chris Rea
 "Loving You" - 3:47
 "If You Choose to Go" - 4:11
 "Guitar Street" - 3:58
 "Do You Still Dream?" - 4:00
 "Every Beat of My Heart" - 3:18
 "Goodbye Little Columbus" - 4:15
 "One Sweet Tender Touch" - 3:50
 "Do It for Your Love" -3:45
 "Just Want to Be with You" - 4:00
 "Runaway" - 3:32
 "When You Know Your Love Has Died" - 4:10

Personnel 
 Chris Rea – lead vocals, acoustic piano (1), Fender Rhodes (1, 8), slide guitar (1-4, 10, 11), guitars (2-11), organ (3, 11), keyboards (6), mandolin (6), accordion (9), dobro (9)
 Max Middleton – keyboards (4), acoustic piano (8)
 Pete Wingfield – keyboards (6), organ (11)
 Mike Moran – acoustic piano (7)
 David Skinner – acoustic piano (10, 11), backing vocals (10)
 Jim Mullen – guitars (1)
 Alan Murphy – lead guitar (4), rhythm guitar (9, 10)
 Martin Kershaw – guitar (5)
 Simon Nicol – rhythm guitar (9), acoustic guitars (10)
 Bruce Lynch – bass guitar (1)
 David Paton – bass guitar  (2, 3, 4, 6, 8-11), backing vocals (10)
 Steve Lawrence – string bass (5)
 Dave Mattacks – drums (1-4, 7, 8)
 Stuart Elliott – drums (3, 9, 10, 11)
 Ray Cooper – percussion (2), tambourine (9)
 Skaila Kanga – harp (5)
 David Snell – harp (5)
 Ron Asprey – saxophone (6, 9)
 The Montmazoomi Sisters – saxophones (9)
 Andrew Powell – string arrangements and conductor (5, 9), bass guitar (7)
 Carol Kenyon – backing vocals (1, 8, 11)
 Katie Kissoon – backing vocals (1, 8, 11)
 Linda Taylor – backing vocals (1, 8, 11)
 Burleigh Drummond – backing vocals (7)
 David Pack – backing vocals (7)
 Joe Puerta – backing vocals (7)

Production 
 Chris Rea – producer 
 Jon Kelly – producer, engineer
 Renate Blauel – assistant engineer
 Tony Richards – assistant engineer
 Brian Palmer – artwork 
 Masaru Kawahara – cover design 
 Andrew Douglas – photography 
 Jim Beach – management 
 J. B. McCoy – management

Studios
 Recorded at AIR Studios, Abbey Road Studios and Odyssey Studios (London, England); Chipping Norton Recording Studios (Oxfordshire, England); Bray Studios (Bray, England).

Singles
 "Loving You" b/w "Let Me be the One"
 "Every Beat of My Heart" b/w "One Sweet Tender Touch"

References

Chris Rea albums
1982 albums
Albums produced by Jon Kelly
Magnet Records albums